Estadio Arquitecto Antonio Eleuterio Ubilla is a multi-use stadium in Melo, Uruguay.  It is currently used primarily for football matches and serves as the home stadium for Cerro Largo FC of the Primera División Uruguaya.  The stadium holds 9,000 spectators.

External links
Stadium information

Arquitecto Antonio Eleuterio Ubilla
Arquitecto Antonio Eleuterio Ubilla
Cerro Largo F.C.
Melo, Uruguay
Sport in Cerro Largo Department